Triathlon, for the 2013 Island Games, were held at Clearwater Beach on St. David's Island, Bermuda. All events for this sport were contested on 14 July 2013.

Medal table
 Bermuda 2013 Triathlon Medal Tally

Events
 2013 IG Triathlon Results Page

References

2013 in triathlon
2013 Island Games
2013